Juan Delgado (born 26 February 1891, date of death unknown) was a Uruguayan footballer. He played in 15 matches for the Uruguay national football team from 1913 to 1920. He was also part of Uruguay's squad for the 1916 South American Championship.

References

External links
 

1891 births
Year of death missing
Uruguayan footballers
Uruguay international footballers
Place of birth missing
Association football midfielders
Central Español players
Peñarol players